Peris Sports Club was a sports club based in Duhok, Iraqi Kurdistan, Iraq.

History

In Premier League
The club participated in the Iraqi Premier League for the first time in the 2003–04 season. The following season, the club was relegated to the Iraq Division One. The club was promoted back to the Premier League in 2007–08 and had its most successful season by reaching the Elite Stage.

At the halfway point of the 2009–10 season, Peris withdrew from the league and the club was dissolved. A new club, Zeravani SC, was founded in 2011 from the remnants of Peris SC.

Honours
Iraq Division One
Winners (1): 2002–03 (shared)

References

External links
 Iraqi Football Website

Defunct football clubs in Iraq
Football clubs in Dohuk